Divya Bhatnagar (15 September 1986 – 7 December 2020) was an Indian television actress.

Career
She appeared in serials like Yeh Rishta Kya Kehlata Hai, Sanskaar-Dharohar Apnon Ki, and Udaan, Sethji and Tera Yaar Hoon Main.

Death
Divya Bhatnagar was diagnosed with COVID-19 in early December and died from the virus on 7 December 2020. High blood pressure may have been a contributing factor. Actress Shilpa Shirodkar gave a heartfelt tribute to her.

References

External links
 

Indian television actresses
1986 births
2020 deaths
Deaths from the COVID-19 pandemic in India
Place of death missing
Place of birth missing
People from Delhi